Danalite is an iron beryllium silicate sulfide mineral with formula: Fe2+4Be3(SiO4)3S. 

It is a rare mineral which occurs in granites, tin bearing pegmatites, contact metamorphic skarns, gneisses and in hydrothermal deposits. It occurs in association with magnetite, garnet, fluorite, albite, cassiterite, pyrite, muscovite, arsenopyrite, quartz, and chlorite.

Danalite was first described in 1866 from a deposit in Essex County, Massachusetts and named for American mineralogist James Dwight Dana (1813–1895).

It has been found in Massachusetts, New Hampshire, Sierra County, New Mexico; Yavapai County, Arizona; Needlepoint Mountain, British Columbia; Walrus Island, James Bay, Quebec; Sweden; Cornwall, England; Imalka and Transbaikal, Russia; Kazakhstan; Somalia; Tasmania; Western Australia and Hiroshima Prefecture, Japan.

References 

Sodalite group
Sulfide minerals
Beryllium minerals
Cubic minerals
Minerals in space group 218